Tú Me Quemas is a song performed by Venezuelan duo Chino & Nacho  featuring the Cuban group Gente de Zona and Venezuelan duo Los Cadillac's, released as the second single from his upcoming live album by Machete Music on July 17, 2014.

Track listing 
 "Tu Me Quemas" (feat. Gente de Zona & Los Cadillac's) -

Charts

Year-end charts

References 

Chino & Nacho songs
Spanish-language songs
2014 singles
Record Report Top 100 number-one singles
Machete Music singles
2014 songs
Gente de Zona songs